Monica Keena (born May 28, 1979) is an American actress. She made her film debut in While You Were Sleeping (1995),  and a lead role as Lilliana "Lilli" Hoffman in Snow White: A Tale of Terror (1997).

She later starred as Lori Campbell in Freddy vs. Jason (2003), and has had roles in the films Brooklyn Rules (2007) and the 2009 remake of Night of the Demons. Keena has also worked in television, starring as Abby Morgan on Dawson's Creek, Rachel Lindquist on the short-lived comedy Undeclared, and Kristen on HBO's Entourage.

Early life
Keena was born and raised in Brooklyn, New York. Her parents are William Junior (a financial sales manager with the firm Paine Webber) and Mary Catherine Keena (a nurse).  She has a sister, Samantha, who is two years older. Monica attended Saint Ann's School, a progressive private school in Brooklyn Heights.

She auditioned for acceptance into LaGuardia High School of Performing Arts at age 13. Although she chose the drama department as her preference, she was accepted in both the dramatic and the vocal arts departments. Soon after starting her classes at LaGuardia, Keena played in her first role in a short film, Burning Love.

Career
Keena portrayed Bertha in a stage reading of Strindberg's The Father and had her first starring role playing Lilliana "Lilli" Hoffman in the folktale-inspired film Snow White: A Tale of Terror. She has appeared in numerous television and movie projects including the TBS Original Movie First Daughter and Crime and Punishment in Suburbia which appeared at the 2000 Sundance Film Festival.

Monica appeared in the film While You Were Sleeping, The Simian Line with Lynn Redgrave, and Bad Girls From Valley High with the film eventually released straight to DVD in 2005. In 2003, she played the heroine Lori Campbell in Freddy vs. Jason. In 2006, she played Celia in the film Left in Darkness.

Keena had a recurring role as Abby Morgan on Dawson's Creek and a starring role on the short-lived Undeclared as the college student Rachel. Keena also had guest roles on series such as Law & Order, Law & Order: Criminal Intent, Homicide: Life on the Street, Feds, and Entourage. On the hit ABC medical drama Grey's Anatomy, she appeared in the second season episode "Into You Like A Train" in which she played Bonnie, a patient who was severely injured in a massive train accident. She later reappeared in the third season episode "Some Kind of Miracle" to reprise her role as Bonnie.

Keena appears as Maddie Curtis in Adam Gierasch's straight-to-video 2009 remake Night of the Demons. It was during filming that she became romantically involved with Edward Furlong. He has been arrested three times for attacking her, and on January 15, 2013, was remanded in jail as he was unable to pay bail. Despite years of trouble the two have remained together and also continue to care for Furlong's son and have been seen together on both of their Instagrams and continue to attend fan conventions.

Filmography

References

External links

 
 Monica Keena at Hollywood.com

1979 births
Living people
American people of Irish descent
Actresses from New Jersey
Actresses from New York City
American film actresses
American television actresses
People from Brooklyn
20th-century American actresses
21st-century American actresses
Fiorello H. LaGuardia High School alumni
Saint Ann's School (Brooklyn) alumni